Yazgulem Range is a mountain range of the western Pamir Mountains. 

It is located in Tajikistan's Gorno-Badakhshan Autonomous Province stretches for about 170 km between the Yazgulyam River and the Bartang River in  the western Pamirs. The range rises in a north-eastern direction from the border with Afghanistan toward its highest elevation at Independence Peak, former 'Revolution Peak' (6,974 m). The average elevation ranges between 4,500 and 6,000 m. Glaciers cover about 630 km2 of the range, including the Fedchenko Glacier stretching northwards.

See also
List of mountains in Tajikistan

References

Mountain ranges of Tajikistan
Gorno-Badakhshan Autonomous Region
Pamir Mountains